The 1905 Australia tour of New Zealand was a collection of rugby union games undertaken by the Australia side against invitational and national teams of New Zealand. It was the first Wallaby overseas tour.

Australia played a total of seven games in New Zealand, with 3 wins and 4 losses.

Matches 
Complete list of matches played by Australia in New Zealand:

Wellington RFU

Nelson Combined

Canterbury

New Zealand

Manawatu / Hawke's Combined

Taranaki / Wangaui

Auckland

Bibliography 
 Evening Post, Monday 21 August 1905, pg. 5
 Nelson Evening Mail Thursday, 24 August 1905, pg. 2
 Press, Sunday 28 August 1905, pg. 8
 Evening Post, Sunday 4 September 1905, pg. 3
 Wanganui Chronicle, Wednesday 6 September 1905, pg. 5
 Evening Post, Monday 11 September 1905, pg. 5
 Wanganui Herald, Tuesday 19 September 1905, pg. 5

Notes

References 

Australia
Waratahs
Australia national rugby union team tours of New Zealand
Tour